Helgasjön is a lake in Växjö Municipality, Kronobergs län in southern Småland.

Kronoberg Castle is situated by the lake.

References 

Växjö
Lakes of Kronoberg County